"Islands" is a song by English musician Mike Oldfield, featuring Welsh singer Bonnie Tyler on vocals. It features on Oldfield's 1987 album of the same name. It was written by Oldfield, who co-produced the track with Tom Newman and Alan Shacklock. The track was released as a single in September 1987 by Virgin Records.

Writing and recording
English musician Mike Oldfield described "Islands" as "the high spot" of its parent album of the same name. In early 1987, he left his partner and children, and had moved to Megève in France. Oldfield wrote "Islands" during that time, while feeling "lonely, isolated and cut off". After struggling with the vocals, he invited Welsh singer Bonnie Tyler to record it, describing her performance as "spine-tingling, exactly the way it was supposed to be".

Critical reception 
In a retrospective review for AllMusic, Mike DeGagne opined that Tyler's vocal "lifts the title track higher than any other cut [on the album]".

Formats and track listings
 UK 7-inch single
"Islands" (featuring Bonnie Tyler) – 4:18
"The Wind Chimes" (Part One) – 2:24

 UK 12-inch single
 "Islands" (featuring Bonnie Tyler) – 5:35
 "When the Nights on Fire" (featuring Anita Hegerland) – 6:42
 "The Wind Chimes" (Part One) – 2:24

Charts

Credits and personnel
Credits adapted from the liner notes of the Islands album.

Recording
 Mastered by Greg Fulginiti at Artisan Sound Recorders

Management
 Published by Oldfield Music Ltd. and Virgin Music (Publishers) Ltd.
 Bonnie Tyler appears courtesy of CBS Records

Personnel

 Mike Oldfield – bass, engineering, guitars, percussion, producer, songwriter, technician, vocals
 Bonnie Tyler – lead vocals
 Micky Moody – electric guitars
 Rick Fenn – acoustic guitar, electric guitar
 Phil Spalding – bass
 Mickey Simmonds  – keyboards
 Raphael Ravenscroft – saxophone
 Andy Mackay – saxophone, oboe
 Pierre Moerlen – drums, vibraphone
 Tony Beard – drums
 Benoit Moerlen – vibraphone, percussion
 Tom Newman – production
 Alan Shacklock – production
 Richard Barrie – assistant engineer, assistant technician
 Serban Ghenea – mixing
 Tom Coyne – mastering

References 

1987 singles
1987 songs
Mike Oldfield songs
Bonnie Tyler songs
Song recordings produced by Tom Newman (musician)
Songs written by Mike Oldfield
Virgin Records singles